Tungsten chloride can refer to:
Tungsten(II) chloride, WCl2
Tungsten(III) chloride, WCl3
Tungsten(IV) chloride, WCl4
Tungsten(V) chloride, WCl5
Tungsten(VI) chloride, WCl6